The 2001 FIA GT Magny-Cours 500 km was the third round the 2001 FIA GT Championship season.  It took place at the Circuit de Nevers Magny-Cours, France, on May 1, 2001.

Official results
Class winners in bold.  Cars failing to complete 70% of winner's distance marked as Not Classified (NC).

Statistics
 Pole position – #7 Larbre Compétition Chereau – 1:43.570
 Fastest lap – #3 Carsport Holland – 1:36.751
 Average speed – 151.300 km/h

References

 
 
 

M
Magny-Cours 500
FIA GT Magny-Cours